Tracked by the Police is a 1927 silent film produced and distributed by the Warner Bros. with a story written by Darryl Zanuck. It stars dog actor Rin Tin Tin. Ray Enright directed with 'Rinty's' costars being Jason Robards, Sr. and Virginia Brown Faire. The film may have had a Vitaphone sound effects/music track that is now lost. The film is preserved at the Library of Congress.

Cast
Rin Tin Tin as Satan
Jason Robards, Sr. as Bob Owen
Virginia Brown Faire as Marcella Bradley
Tom Santschi as "Sandy" Sturgeon
Nanette the Dog as Satan's girlfriend
Dave Morris as "Wyoming" Willie
Theodore Lorch as "Bull" Storm
Wilfrid North as Tom Bradley
Ben Walker as Crook

See also
List of early Warner Bros. sound and talking features

Preservation status
Prints of Tracked by the Police are held by George Eastman House and the Library of Congress.

References

External links

synopsis; allmovie.com
lobby poster(Wayback Machine)
 2nd lobby poster
Full movie at Internet Archive

1927 films
American silent feature films
Films directed by Ray Enright
Films based on short fiction
1927 adventure films
American adventure films
American black-and-white films
Surviving American silent films
Rin Tin Tin
Silent adventure films
1920s American films